Elif Köroğlu is a Turkish female football referee and long-distance runner.

Elif Köroğlu began her official career in the amateur league match in March 2015. She served in the role of referee in various age categories of the amateur league between 2016 and 2017. In July 2017, she was promoted to the position of professional referee. She serves as a referee in the women's and men's professional leagues.

She started her athletics by running in the 4K meters branch. When she was only 14 years old, she ran 55.02 seconds and became the third in Turkey. She then continued in the 400 meters branch. In 2013 she started running 5K, 10K, 15K, 25K, 21K and 42K. She has different championships in these branches as well.

References

External links 

 

Living people
Turkish football referees
Turkish women referees and umpires
Women association football referees
Turkish female long-distance runners
Year of birth missing (living people)